Marcus Arrecinus Clemens (fl. 1st century), was a prefect of the Praetorian Guard during the reign of Vespasian. In return for his faithful service, Clemens was promoted to other important positions, including being twice consul and urban prefect of Rome.

Arrecinus Clemens was born into an equestrian family from Pisaurum, being the homonymous son of Emperor Gaius' Praetorian Prefect. Clemens' sister was Arrecina Tertulla, the first wife of the future Emperor Titus. Despite being a member of the Senate, he was placed at the head of the Praetorian Guard in 70 by Vespasian's political ally, Gaius Licinius Mucianus, amidst concerns that the current commander, Arrius Varus, was growing too politically influential. Clemens held the position until June of 71, when Vespasian's son Titus replaced him. According to Tacitus, Clemens was chosen because his father, Marcus Arrecinus Clemens, had honourably commanded the Guard during the reign of Emperor Caligula.

Following these events, Clemens held a suffect consulship in 73, governed the province of Hispania Tarraconensis, held a second consulship in 85, and was made city prefect of Rome in 86. 

Suetonius relates a harrowing story concerning Clemens' end. The emperor Domitian invited Clemens to accompany him on a drive; as they passed a person both recognized, Domitian turned to Clemens and asked, "Shall we listen to that rascally fellow tomorrow?" The next day the "rascally fellow" was revealed to be a delator or informer who had brought charges on Clemens; the former Urban Prefect was found guilty and executed. However, Gavin Townend notes an inscription from Rudiae, in the extreme heel of Italy, on which one M. Arrecinus Clemens is commemorated by his wife Cornelia Ocel[lina], suggesting that Suetonius was in error and that Clemens was instead banished and died in exile.

References

Further reading 
 
 George W. Houston, "Vespasian's Adlection of Men in Senatum", American Journal of Philology, 98 (1977), pp. 35-63
 Brian W. Jones and R. Develin, "M. Arrecinus Clemens", Antichthon, 10 (1976), pp. 79–83.

1st-century Romans
Clemens, Marcus
Executed ancient Roman people
Flavian dynasty
People executed by the Roman Empire
Praetorian prefects
Roman governors of Hispania Tarraconensis
Suffect consuls of Imperial Rome
Urban prefects of Rome